opened in Kainan, Wakayama Prefecture in 1982. The displays relate to the geology, flora, and fauna of the area, while the research collection includes some 167,000 specimens.

See also

 Wakayama Prefectural Museum
 Kagoshima City Museum of Art

References

External links
  Wakayama Prefectural Museum of Natural History

Kainan, Wakayama
Museums in Wakayama Prefecture
Museums established in 1982
1982 establishments in Japan
Natural history museums in Japan